Schouten is a surname of Dutch origin. It generally has an occupational root, where the forebear was a schout, but can also be patronymic, as Schoute once was used as a given name. The name is quite common in the Netherlands, ranking 37th in 2007 (17,626 people). Variations include Schout, Schoute, Schoutens, Scholten and Scholte. People with this surname include:

 Ank Bijleveld-Schouten (b. 1962), Dutch politician
 Antonie Schouten (b. 1946), Canadian field hockey player
  (b. 1967), Dutch speedskating coach
 Bas Schouten (b. 1994), Dutch racing driver
 Bryan Schouten (b. 1994), Dutch motorcycle racer
 Carola Schouten (b. 1977), Dutch politician
 Dirk Bernard Joseph Schouten (1923–2018), Dutch economist
 Erik Schouten (b. 1991), Dutch footballer
  (b. 1977), Dutch boxer
 Gerrit Schouten (1779-1839), Surinamese diorama artist 
 Henk Schouten (1932–2018), Dutch footballer
 Irene Schouten (b. 1992), Dutch speed skater
 Jaap Schouten (b. 1984), Dutch rower
 Jan Arnoldus Schouten (1883-1971), Dutch mathematician
 Jan Frederik Schouten (1910-1980), Dutch physician
 Jerdy Schouten (b. 1977), Dutch footballer
 Johanna Schouten-Elsenhout (1910-1992), Surinamese poet
 Joost Schouten (c.1600-1640), Member of the Council of the Dutch East India Company
 Lydia Schouten (b. 1948), Dutch performance and video artist
 Peter Schouten, Australian illustrator in the field of zoology and palaeontology.
 Pieter Schouten (fl. 1622-1625), Dutch corsair and privateer
 Pieter Hendrik Schoute (1846-1923), Dutch mathematician
 Raymond Schouten (b. 1985), Dutch motorcycle racer
 Willem Schouten (c. 1567-1625), Dutch explorer and circumnavigator who named Cape Horn
 Wim Schouten (1878–1941), Dutch Olympic sailor
  (1638-1704), Dutch physician and travel writer
Schoute
 Pieter Hendrik Schoute (1846–1913), Dutch mathematician
Schout
Pieter Jacobsz Schout (1570 – 1645), Dutch mayor of Haarlem.
Members of the Haarlem schutterij portrayed by Frans Hals between 1616 and 1639, including Cornelis Jacobsz Schout, Jacob Cornelisz Schout, Loth Schout, and Pieter Schout

Named after a Schouten 

Islands:
 Schouten Island, island in Tasmania named after Joost Schouten
 Schouten Islands or Biak Islands or Geelvink Islands, in Indonesia, north of New Guinea, named after Willem Schouten, who visited them in 1616
 Schouten Islands or Eastern Schouten Islands or Le Maire Islands, of Papua New Guinea, named after Willem Schouten, who visited them in 1616
 Schouten languages, spoken on and near the Schouten Islands of Papua New Guinea
 11773 Schouten, a main-belt asteroid named after Willem Schouten
Mathematics (named after Jan Arnoldus Schouten)
 Schouten tensor, a mathematical object related to differential geometry
 Schouten–Nijenhuis bracket, mathematical operator
 Weyl–Schouten theorem
 Schoutenia, a plant genus named after the explorer Willem Schouten
J.F. Schouten School for User System Interaction named after Jan Frederik Schouten

See also
Scholten

References

Dutch-language surnames
Occupational surnames
Patronymic surnames